Discovery Home & Leisure has been used as a name for the following channels:
Planet Green
Discovery Real Time
Discovery Turbo (Asia)